The Australia First Party (NSW) Incorporated, often shortened to the Australia First Party (AFP), is an Australian far-right political party founded in 1996 by Graeme Campbell. The policies of Australia First have been described as ultranationalist, anti-multicultural and economically protectionist. The party's logo includes the Southern Cross of the Eureka Flag.

The AFP's current leader, Jim Saleam, is a Lebanese Australian, a convicted arsonist, a former member of the neo-Nazi National Socialist Party of Australia and founder of the militant Australian white supremacist group National Action.

History

Campbell era 
The Australia First Party was established in June 1996 by Graeme Campbell, and registered as a political party by the Australian Electoral Commission (AEC) on 13 September 1996. Campbell had been the federal Labor member for Kalgoorlie since 1980. However, he was disendorsed by Labor in 1995, and continued to sit in parliament as an independent. He was reelected as an independent at the 1996 Australian federal election, and formed AFP soon after. However, AFP was not successful at the 1998 federal election and Campbell lost his seat, blaming his loss on Australia First being eclipsed by One Nation. In 2009, he claimed that, if not for the presence of a One Nation candidate, he would have picked up an additional 8.5% of the vote, which would have been enough to keep him in the race.

Campbell remained Australia First's leader until June 2001, when he left the party to stand (unsuccessfully) as a One Nation Senate candidate in Western Australia. At the 2004 federal election, Campbell attempted unsuccessfully to regain his old federal seat as an independent. He again stood for the Senate in Western Australia at the 2007 federal election as an independent, but only achieved 0.13% of the vote.

Saleam era

Saleam has served two jail terms, one for property offences and fraud in 1984 and one for being an accessory before the fact in 1989 for his involvement in the shotgun attack on the home of African National Congress representative Eddie Funde.

In 2002, Jim Saleam ran as an AFP candidate for a seat on Marrickville council, New South Wales, claiming "to oppose Marrickville being a Refugee Welcome Zone". Later that year the party formed its youth wing, the Patriotic Youth League. 
AFP was deregistered by the AEC on 13 August 2004 for failing to nominate candidates at elections for four years. By 2007, Saleam had reestablished AFP, and in July 2009, Saleam claimed that the party had 500 members, and announced that he was registering its New South Wales branch, Australia First Party (NSW) Incorporated, with the AEC. The branch was registered by AEC on 13 June 2010, in time for the 2010 federal election.

At the 2013 federal election, AFP was involved in Glenn Druery's Minor Party Alliance. Saleam stood in the seat of Cook on a platform to end refugee intakes, running against Scott Morrison, and received 617 votes, or 0.67% of the vote.

On 14 July 2015, the AEC de-registered the AFP due to its failure to demonstrate the required 500 members. It was re-registered on 1 March 2016 as "Australia First Party (NSW) Incorporated".

AFP contested the 2016 federal election, without any success. Saleam stood in the seat of Lindsay, New South Wales, receiving 1068 votes or 1.2% of the vote. In October 2016, the Australia First Party joined with the Australian Protectionist Party, Nationalist Alternative, Eureka Youth League, and Hellenic Nationalists of Australia to form the Australian Coalition of Nationalists, as a framework for cooperation between these entities.

Saleam also stood for AFP in the 2018 Longman by-election, receiving 709 votes or 0.8% of the vote.

Saleam stood in the seat of Cootamundra, New South Wales, in the 2017 by-election as an independent, though still a member of Australia First, as the party was not registered for NSW elections. He received 453 votes, 1% of the total. He again stood in the seat at the 2019 New South Wales state election as an independent. Saleam's platform included the reintroduction of the White Australia policy and opposition to Chinese immigration.

On 2 May 2014 the party aligned itself with the Golden Dawn party of Greece, a Metaxist fascist organisation, and on 24 July 2016, the party endorsed former Grand Wizard of the Ku Klux Klan David Duke for the 2016 Louisiana election via Twitter.

On 12 January 2022, the party was de-registered by the Australian Electoral Commission for failing to meet the increased requirement of 1,500 members.

Policies and electoral performance

The party stands on a nationalist, anti-multicultural and economic protectionist platform.

The Australia First Party has been largely unsuccessful electorally. It has been elected to two local council seats, one in City of Penrith and one in City of Prospect. Saleam ran as a candidate in the 2018 Longman by-election, receiving 684 votes or 0.8% of the vote.

In the 2019 Australian federal election, the party put up three candidates: Susan Jakobi in Lalor, Peter Schubeck for Longman, and Michael Chehoff for Swan.

Queensland

New South Wales

South Australia

Western Australia

Activities 

The Australia First Party's activities have mainly consisted of distributing anti-immigration and racist pamphlets and protesting, although they denied involvement in some highly racist leaflets dropped in mailboxes in 2010 Campbelltown.

Cronulla riots (2005)
The group played a large role in the 2005 Cronulla riots. In the week prior to the riots, the AFP encouraged members to go to the seaside suburb of Cronulla. Its website called for "patriots" to show solidarity with victims of "anti-Australian race and hate and violence". AFP claim that 120 members and supporters attended the riots, and both members of the AFP and their youth wing the Patriotic Youth League were seen handing out anti-immigration leaflets and supplying alcohol there. Their website later described the riots as a "civil uprising of the Australian people".

Nathan Sykes arrest
On 20 March 2019, Australia First member Nathan Sykes, described as a "prolific online troll and a lieutenant of Australia's most prominent white supremacist Jim Saleam", was charged with at least eight offences, after allegations that he made repeated and detailed violent threats to Melbourne journalist and lawyer Luke McMahon. He had previously made numerous racist and intimidating online comments targeting high-profile Australians, including ex-Racial Discrimination Commissioner Tim Soutphommasane, activist Mariam Veiszadeh and Guardian journalist Van Badham.

Patriotic/Eureka Youth League
The Patriotic Youth League was formed in 2002 by former One Nation activist Stuart McBeth as the youth wing of the Australia First Party. It was described by numerous media commentators and academics as a far right, white nationalist youth organisation that has been linked to neo-Nazism, including the now-disbanded US-based Volksfront, and hate crimes.

The group was mainly active in the northern suburbs of Sydney and Melbourne, and played a large role in the 2005 Cronulla riots. They distributed white power leaflets in the days prior to the riots, displayed banners saying "Aussies fighting back" at the riots, and also distributed pamphlets and alcohol during the riots.

The league disbanded in 2006, but was reincarnated as the Eureka Youth League in 2010 (not to be confused with the historical Eureka Youth League).  the Eureka Youth League has a website and Facebook group, although the last post on the latter was in October 2017.

Racism allegations 
Australia First Party is  led by convicted criminal and neo-Nazi Jim Saleam. Saleam was a member of the short-lived National Socialist Party of Australia as a teenager during the early 1970s and the founder of the militant Australian white supremacist group National Action.

Australia First also endorsed independent candidate John Moffat, who was later criticised by B'nai B'rith Anti-Defamation Commission chairman Michael Lipshutz, Cronulla Liberal MLA Malcolm Kerr and Lebanese Muslim Association spokesman Jihad Dib for "inciting racial hatred".

On 10 July 2009, the Sydney Morning Herald reported that David Palmer, the Imperial Wizard of the Ku Klux Klan in Australia, said several Klan members had secretly joined Australia First. Palmer said Australia First had been identified as an Aryan party and would prove useful "in case the ethnics get out of hand and they need sorting out." The Australia First Party later endorsed former Grand Wizard of the Ku Klux Klan David Duke for the 2016 Louisiana election via Twitter.

In July 2010, it was reported that Australia First was distributing leaflets comparing Africans to monkeys, and "blaming Africans for the social problems in Sydney's west". Australia First denied responsibility for the leaflets, claiming that they had been distributed in an attempt to discredit the party.

The Australia First Party used Sinophobia and fear of African Australians in their campaign during the 2019 election.

See also 
 Far-right politics in Australia
 Reclaim Australia
 Romper Stomper
 True Blue Crew
 United Patriots Front
 List of white nationalist organizations

Notes

References

External links 
 
 Australia First (historic – 2008–2012)

1996 establishments in Australia
2002 establishments in Australia
Far-right political parties in Australia
Neo-Nazi political parties
Neo-Nazism in Australia
Political parties established in 1996